Anil Jain may refer to:

Anil Jain (cricketer) (born 1942), Indian cricketer
Anil Jain (Madhya Pradesh politician) (born 1972), Indian politician
Anil Jain (Uttar Pradesh politician), Indian politician
Anil K. Jain (electrical engineer, born 1946) (1946–1988), Indian-American electrical engineer at the University of California, Davis
Anil K. Jain (computer scientist, born 1948), Indian-American computer scientist at Michigan State University